Cecil Irwin (born 8 April 1942) was an English footballer who played as a right-back for Sunderland.

Playing career
Irwin made his debut for Sunderland on 20 September 1958 against Ipswich Town in a 2–0 defeat at Roker Park. He went on to make 313 league appearances, scoring just a single goal at his time with the club.

Player-manager career
After finishing his stint with Sunderland, he moved on to Yeovil Town as a player-manager, staying with them from 1972 to 1975, when his contract was not renewed. He moved on to play for Ashington, also managing the Colliers for a year.

Managerial career
Cecil continued to manage after his playing days were done, managing Ashington, just outside his hometown of Ellington twice more, first in 1996–98, and again in 2000–02, the latter time managing his squad to promotion, but unable to stick in the new league and being let go after relegation the next year.

References

Living people
1942 births
Sportspeople from Ashington
Footballers from Northumberland
English footballers
Association football fullbacks
Ashington A.F.C. players
Ashington A.F.C. managers
Sunderland A.F.C. players
Yeovil Town F.C. players
Yeovil Town F.C. managers
Vancouver Royals players
United Soccer Association players
English football managers
English expatriate footballers
English expatriate sportspeople in Canada
Expatriate soccer players in Canada